Bohdan Tsap (30 April 1941 – 6 November 2012) was a Ukrainian professional football coach and player.

Playing and coaching career
Tsap made his professional career in the different football teams of the Ukrainian SSR.

Since 1981 he worked as an assistant manager with FC Karpaty Lviv youth school. From 1989 to his retirement in July 2012 he served as Director of this school. He was the first trainer for footballers Vasyl Kardash, Vitaliy Postranskyi, Oleh Boychyshyn, Andriy Hayduk.

Death
Tsap died on 6 November 2012 at the age of 71.

Honours
 with Carpathian Military District Team
champion among Soviet Army teams: 1963.

References

1941 births
2012 deaths
People from Horodok, Lviv Oblast
Soviet footballers
Ukrainian footballers
Soviet Top League players
NK Veres Rivne players
FC Nyva Vinnytsia players
SKA Lviv players
Ukrainian football managers
Association football defenders
Sportspeople from Lviv Oblast